The Ministry of Culture (Spanish: Ministerio de Cultura) of the Dominican Republic is a government institution in charge of cultural activities, cultural heritage and creative manifestations. Its main objective is to protect the nation's identity, guarantying the cultural rights of its people. At the same time, it coordinates awards, festivals, fairs, museums, among others.

It appeared on 2000 as the Secretary of State of Culture (Secretaría de Estado de Culture). Its headquarters are located at Santo Domingo. Its Minister is Milagros Germán, since October 10, 2021.

History 

The first reference to an office dedicated specifically to culture in the Dominican Republic can be found on 1934 with the creation of the Secretary of State of Education and Fine Arts (Secretaría de Estado de Educación y Bellas Artes). This is the origin of the modern Ministry of Education. On 1965, this institution received the name Secretary of State of Education, Fine Arts and Worship (Secretaría de Estado de Educación, Bellas Artes y Cultos), taking attributions from the Secretary of State of External Relations. On 1997, its name would change again to Secretary of State of Education and Culture (Secretaría de Estado de Educación y Cultura).

On 1979, a UNESCO mission, together with Dominican intellectuals, made a diagnosis of the government cultural institutions, which concluded that these offices were scattered between several Secretaries and that it was necessary to create a consolidated organism to take over all cultural matters.

It wouldn't be until 1997, during the first presidency of Leonel Fernández, that the Presidential Board of Culture (Consejo Presidencial de Cultura) was created to coordinate the General Archive of the Nation, the National Library, the National Theater, several museums, school, theaters and other cultural and crafts centers. This Board was led by singer and composer Víctor Víctor.

To answer these demands of artists and intellectuals, on June 28, 2000, Leonel Fernandez's Government signed Law 41–00, which would definitely create the Secretary of State of Culture (Secretaría de Estado de Cultura) as the coordinator of all cultural matters.

It adopted its current name, Ministry of Culture (Ministerio de Cultura), after the 2010 Constitutional reform and the subsequent Decree no. 56-10 which changed the names of all government agencies.

Internal structure 

Similar to other Ministries of the Dominican Republic, the Ministry of Culture is subdivided into vice-ministries. These are:

 Vice-ministry of Cultural Development and Investigation
 Vice-ministry of Creativity and Artistic Training
 Vice-ministry of Cultural Heritage
 Vice-ministry of Cultural Identity and Citizenship
 Vice-ministry of Cultural Identities
 Vice-ministry for Territorial Decentralization and Coordination

Affiliated institutions 

The Ministry of Culture is in charge of many different cultural activities. This is the reason why it has many affiliated agencies, according to the different arts and cultural centers. Some of these are:

 Great Cibao Theater
 Eduardo Brito National Theater
 National Craftsmanship Center
 General Office of Cinematography
 Visual Arts National School
 Drama National School
 National Conservatory
 National Center for Works of Arts and Documents Conservation
 Pedro Henríquez Ureña National Library
 Dominican National Ballet
 Narciso González Cultural Center
 Elia Mena National School of Music

Other offices also connected to this Ministry are:

 Dominican National Committee to the UNESCO
 Public Shows National Committee
 General Office of Museums
 National Office of Landmark Heritage
 National Office of Sub-aquatic Cultural Heritage
 National Office of Books and Reading

The National Archive of the Nation became an autonomous institution on 2010.

References

External links 

 Ministry of Culture - official website

Government of the Dominican Republic
Dominican_Republic